The Lydney Canal is a one-mile canal in Gloucestershire that runs inland from the River Severn to Lydney. It was opened in 1813 to trans-ship iron and coal from the Forest of Dean. It was once connected by a horse-drawn tramroad to Pidcock's Canal which brought materials down to the wharves by tub-boat.

In the 1960s imported wood was still being brought in by barge from Avonmouth. It remained in commercial use until the 1980s. The entrance to the canal consists of an outer tidal gate opening into a wide basin. From there a lock opens into the one-mile canal cut. Immediately above the lock, a pair of gates points the other way as protection against a high tidal flood in the estuary. There is one swing bridge across the canal.

The docks were restored between 2003 and 2005, using money from the Heritage Lottery Fund and others, to create a marina and harbour area for seagoing yachts and motor boats. In 2015 the outer lock gates failed in the open position and are inoperable. Consequently the harbour has become silted up from River Severn mud and is out of use.

Timeline

 1809 – The Lydney and Lydbrook Railway Act enabled construction of a tramroad from Lydbrook to Lydney.
 1810 – A second act changed the company name to the "Severn & Wye Railway and Canal Company" and (amongst other things) authorises the building of the canal to the River Severn at Nass Point.

 1810 – Josias Jessop (son of William Jessop) was appointed consulting engineer and designed plans for the canal.
 1811 – Thomas Sheasby (son of Thomas Sheasby senior) was taken on as resident engineer.
 1813 – The canal was opened by the Severn and Wye Railway and Canal Company.
 1821 – The outer harbour was completed and the tramway extended all the way down.
 1825 – The north pier was extended to aid ships' passage into the harbour.
 1868 – The tramway was converted to broad gauge.
 1872 – Converted to standard gauge.
 1893 – Severn and Wye Railway and Canal Company went bankrupt.
 1894 – Purchased by the Great Western and Midland Railways and administered by a Joint Committee of the two companies.
 1948 – The railway and docks passed to the Western Region of the Railway Executive on nationalization.
 1950 – Transferred to the Docks and Inland Waterways Executive.
 1960 – The last coal was shipped from the harbour.
 1977 – The harbour was closed.
 1985 – The section from the swing bridge to the Severn was scheduled as an Ancient Monument 
 1988 – The swing bridge was scheduled as a Grade II listed building.
 1996 – The Environment Agency took over management of the docks.
 1997 – Inner gates collapsed and were replaced by a dam to reduce flood risk.
 1998 – The Lydney Docks Partnership was established to create a sustainable future for the canal.
 2005 – Re-opened after a two-year project of restoration and enhancement.
 2015 – Outer lock gates became stuck in the open position leaving the harbour tidal and inaccessible.

River Lyd

The Lyd is a small river in the Forest of Dean in Gloucestershire, England.

The Lyd flows into the River Severn via the canal in Lydney.

See also

Canals of Great Britain
History of the British canal system

References

External links

Satellite image from Google Maps
 Historical Account of the Navigable Rivers, Canals, and Railways, Joseph Priestley

Canals in Gloucestershire
Ports and harbours of Gloucestershire
Canals linked to the River Severn
Lydney
Canals opened in 1813
1Lydney